Weltklasse Zürich is an annual, invitation-only, world-class track and field meeting at the Letzigrund in Zürich, Switzerland, generally held at the end of August or beginning of September. Previously one of the IAAF Golden League events, it now serves as a final of the Wanda Diamond League, alongside  Memorial Van Damme between 2010 and 2019. In 2021, Welklasse Zürich will serve as the sole final of the Diamond League. One of the first large-scale international athletics events (outside the Summer Olympics), it is sometimes referred to as the one-day Olympics. Weltklasse Zürich first took place on 12 August 1928. In the beginning, the meeting was nicknamed by the public the "Nurmi meeting" after the most admired and celebrated participant at the time, Paavo Nurmi. On 21 June 1960, on the Letzigrund track, Armin Hary became the first human to run the 100 m dash in 10.0 seconds.

UBS has supported Weltklasse Zürich as its main sponsor since 1981. Other sponsors are Vaudoise Assurances, Migros, Le Gruyère Switzerland, Medica, Omega, Swiss, Lexus, Erdgas and Puma.

History
The meeting was conceived in 1924 by athletic section of the FC Zürich which became 1934 the Leichtathletik Club Zürich and first held at the Letzigrund on a dirt track on 12 August 1928 as the Internationales Leichtathletik-Meeting in Zürich. The meet would not be held regularly on an annual basis until 1973, and the Weltklasse introduced electronic timing the following year.

Track surface
The first surface was made of dirt in 1928, and the first synthetic track surface in Europe was installed in 1968. The number of lanes was increased to eight in the early 1970s which forced the Weltklasse to be put on hold for a few years for the construction to take place.

The current surface at the Letzigrund Stadium was developed in 2014 by the Swiss company CONICA. The new surface was installed in June 2014 at a cost of 800,000 CHF and was paid for by the city of Zurich, which owns Letzigrund Stadium.

World records
Over the course of its history, numerous world records have been set at Weltklasse Zürich.

Meeting records

Men

Women

See also
Spitzen Leichtathletik Luzern

References

External links

Diamond League – Zürich official website

 
Sport in Zürich
Diamond League
IAAF Golden League
Athletics competitions in Switzerland
Recurring sporting events established in 1928
Summer events in Switzerland
IAAF World Outdoor Meetings